I'm a Celebrity...Get Me Out of Here! returned for its twentieth series on 15 November 2020 on ITV. Due to the COVID-19 travel restrictions, the series was not filmed in Australia for the first time in the show's history, but was instead filmed at Gwrych Castle in Abergele, Wales.

Ant & Dec returned to host the series. In January 2020, it was announced that I'm a Celebrity: Extra Camp had been axed. In October 2020, it was announced that Vick Hope would present a new online spin-off entitled I'm a Celebrity...The Daily Drop that would also be repeated on ITV2.

On 4 December 2020, the series was won by Giovanna Fletcher, with Jordan North finishing as the runner-up. Fletcher won the show with 50.27% of the final vote, making it the closest ever voting percentage between the final two campmates.

Filming location
On 7 August 2020, it was announced that, due to the COVID-19 travel restrictions, filming would be taking place at Gwrych Castle in Abergele, Wales, instead of Murwillumbah, New South Wales, Australia.

As part of the agreement with Gwrych Castle Preservation Trust, ITV announced that it would help support the ongoing restoration project of the site, donating money to the trust for the use of the site for four months, as well as paying for additional emergency restoration work.

On 23 October 2020, Wales entered into a circuit breaker lockdown, which led many to speculate that the series could face delays or cancellation. However, on 20 October, it was confirmed that pre-production of the series, and filming of the series itself, would be permitted to go ahead, provided local coronavirus protocols were followed.

Reaction to relocation
Initial reactions to the new filming locations were mixed, with fans expression confusion and amusement as to how various aspects of the show would be translated into a Welsh setting.

On 2 September 2020, Vale of Clwyd MP James Davies and Prime Minister Boris Johnson both welcomed the relocation during a session of Prime Minister's Questions.

In the weeks leading up to filming, many local residents complained of the close proximity of the filming location to residential areas, particularly as public paths near Gwrych Castle were closed for privacy and security reasons.

Once the series began, viewers reacted positively to the new location. Journalist Katie Archer from Radio Times suggested that the relocation to Gwrych Castle become a permanent feature as a way of refreshing the format.

Celebrities
The line-up was announced on 8 November 2020 during I'm a Celebrity: A Jungle Story.

Results and elimination
 Indicates that the celebrity received the most votes from the public.
 Indicates that the celebrity received the fewest votes and was eliminated immediately (no bottom two/three)
 Indicates that the celebrity was named as being in the bottom two/three

 The public voted for who they wanted to win, rather than save.

Trials
The contestants take part in daily trials to earn food. These trials aim to test both physical and mental abilities. The winner is usually determined by the number of stars collected during the trial, with each star representing a meal earned by the winning contestant for their fellow celebrities.
 
 The public voted for who they wanted to face the trial
 The contestants decided who would face the trial
 The trial was compulsory and neither the public nor celebrities decided who took part
 

 In this challenge, the celebrities were competing for their kits rather than their meals
 The celebrities were separated into two teams, The Lords (AJ, Jordan, Mo, Russell, Shane and Vernon) and The Ladies (Beverley, Giovanna, Hollie, Jessica, Ruthie and Victoria).
 As a result of the girls losing the live trial the previous day, it was compulsory for them to take part in this trial. One by one, they had 12 minutes to unlock themselves from the bar and earn two stars. The order was Giovanna, Ruthie, Beverley, Jessica, Hollie and Victoria. Victoria managed to unlock herself but failed to get two stars in time.
 Beverley was ruled out of this trial on medical grounds.
 In this trial, each star was worth two meals for camp.
 Russell was ruled out of this trial on medical grounds.

Star count

Castle Coin Challenges
As well as competing in the trials, celebrities have to complete 'Castle Coin Challenges' in order to earn treats for themselves. At least 2 celebrities will be chosen to compete in the challenge. They must complete the challenge they have been given in order to win 'Castle Coins'. After completion of the challenge, the celebrities will take the Castle Coins and head to the Ye Olde Shoppe, where they will purchase one of two snack options, from Kiosk Cledwyn. However, before they are allowed to take the prize, the other celebrities back at the living quarters must answer a question either based on a recent survey or a general knowledge question. If they get the question right, they will earn the treat, but if they get it wrong, the celebrities will go back empty-handed.

 The celebrities got the question correct
 The celebrities got the question wrong
 No question was asked

 As part of a secret mission to win luxury items for camp, Russell and Ruthie had to convince the celebrities to answer the question incorrectly.
 The campmates taking part in the Castle Coin challenge were selected at random. Beverley, Giovanna, Jessica and Ruthie each had to select one campmate for whom they wanted to win a spa day. They chose Vernon, Hollie, Giovanna and Russell respectively. There was no question asked to receive the spa day.
 The campmates taking part in the Castle Coin challenge were playing for access to the castle pub, 'The Castle Inn'.

Controversies
 On 13 November 2020, the RSPCA stated that they had "serious concerns about the welfare of animals" featured in the programme. They stated that the production company had got in touch with them ahead of the 20th series taking place in the UK, where the RSPCA had advised they consider using welfare-friendly alternatives to animals in the Bushtucker trials, but that they were "really disappointed" that animals were still planned to be used in the trials. They recommended viewers could contact Ofcom, or ITV directly if they wanted to take action.
 On 21 November 2020, a 58-year-old woman, Sharn Iona Hughes, was killed after being hit by a car while attempting to take photos of the lights at Gwrych Castle.  
 On 24 November 2020, rural crime officers from North Wales Police announced they were investigating set management and biosecurity, after concerns were raised by conservationists that the cockroaches, whip scorpions, mealworms and crayfish used in bushtucker trials might escape into the local environment. Gwrych Castle woods is a site of special scientific interest, meaning it is home to some of the country's rarest species or habitats, and so would be particularly vulnerable to invasive non-native species.

Ratings
Official ratings are taken from BARB, utilising the four-screen dashboard which includes viewers who watched the programme on laptops, smartphones, and tablets within 7 days of the original broadcast.

References

External links
 

20
2020 British television seasons
Television shows filmed in Wales
Television shows set in Wales
COVID-19 pandemic in the United Kingdom
Television series impacted by the COVID-19 pandemic